Beta-defensin 119 is a protein that in humans is encoded by the DEFB119 gene.

References

Further reading

Defensins